Adrienne Martyn (born 1950 in Wellington) is a New Zealand art photographer. Her work has been collected by numerous art galleries, museums and libraries in New Zealand including the Museum of New Zealand Te Papa Tongarewa, the Dowse Art Museum, the Auckland Art Gallery, the Christchurch Art Gallery and the Hocken Library.

Photographic style and works 
Martyn is an acclaimed New Zealand photographer. She is known for her black-and-white portraiture of other New Zealand artists, with her best-known works including portraits of artist Joanna Paul. Her works have been collected by the Museum of New Zealand Te Papa Tongarewa, Auckland Art Gallery, and Dunedin Public Art Gallery. Her portraiture work was the focus of an exhibition by the Dunedin Public Art Gallery in 1988.

In 1999 Martyn was the inaugural recipient of the Samuel Marsden Collegiate School artist in residence programme and was the artist in residence at the Waikato Museum in 2000. In 2007 Martyn held a solo exhibit at the City Gallery Wellington.

Martyn's recent work has shifted to concentrate on studies of interiors of empty buildings, as exemplified by her 2018 series "The Times" and "Bank". In March 2018 she held a solo exhibition at the Invercargill Public Art Gallery entitled "Shift" in which she exhibited photographs taken of the interior of Anderson House.

References 

1950 births
Living people
New Zealand artists
New Zealand photographers
People from Wellington City